Lungisani Ndlela (born 8 September 1980 in Frankfort, Free State) is a South African Association football striker for Premier Soccer League club Moroka Swallows and South Africa. Standing at 2.00m, he is one of the tallest players in world football.

Career statistics

International goals

References

External links

1980 births
Living people
South African soccer players
South Africa international soccer players
People from Mafube Local Municipality
Soccer players from the Free State (province)
Association football forwards
Moroka Swallows F.C. players
SuperSport United F.C. players
Mamelodi Sundowns F.C. players
University of Pretoria F.C. players
2005 CONCACAF Gold Cup players